The 2018 Italian Open (also known as the 2018 Rome Masters and sponsored title 2018 Internazionali BNL d'Italia) was a professional tennis tournament played on |outdoor clay courts at the Foro Italico in Rome, Italy from 14 to 20 May 2018. It was the 75th edition of the Italian Open and it is classified as an ATP World Tour Masters 1000 event on the 2018 ATP World Tour and a Premier 5 event on the 2018 WTA Tour.

Points and prize money

Point distribution

Prize money

ATP singles main-draw entrants

Seeds 
The following are the seeded players. Seedings are based on ATP rankings as of 7 May 2018. Rankings and points before are as of 14 May 2018.

The following players would have been seeded, but they withdrew from the event.

Other entrants
The following players received wildcards into the main draw:
  Matteo Berrettini
  Marco Cecchinato
  Andreas Seppi
  Lorenzo Sonego

The following players received entry from the qualifying draw:
  Filippo Baldi 
  Nikoloz Basilashvili
  Federico Delbonis
  Nicolás Jarry 
  Malek Jaziri 
  Frances Tiafoe 
  Stefanos Tsitsipas

Withdrawals
Before the tournament
  Roberto Bautista Agut → replaced by  Steve Johnson
  Hyeon Chung → replaced by  Alexandr Dolgopolov
  Roger Federer → replaced by  Denis Shapovalov
  Filip Krajinović → replaced by  Aljaž Bedene
  Nick Kyrgios → replaced by  Ryan Harrison
  Andy Murray → replaced by  Leonardo Mayer
  Milos Raonic → replaced by  Peter Gojowczyk
  Andrey Rublev → replaced by  Daniil Medvedev
  Jo-Wilfried Tsonga → replaced by  Benoît Paire

ATP doubles main-draw entrants

Seeds

Rankings are as of May 7, 2018.

Other entrants
The following pairs received wildcards into the doubles main draw:
  Simone Bolelli /  Fabio Fognini
  Julian Ocleppo /  Andrea Vavassori

The following pair received entry as alternates:
  Pablo Carreño Busta /  João Sousa

Withdrawals
Before the tournament
  Bob Bryan

WTA singles main-draw entrants

Seeds

Rankings are as of 7 May 2018.

Other entrants
The following players received wildcards into the main draw:
  Sara Errani
  Camilla Rosatello
  Francesca Schiavone
  Samantha Stosur
  Roberta Vinci

The following players received entry using a protected ranking:
  Victoria Azarenka
  Laura Siegemund

The following players received entry from the qualifying draw:
  Danielle Collins
  Polona Hercog
  Hsieh Su-wei 
  Kaia Kanepi
  Ajla Tomljanović
  Alison Van Uytvanck
  Donna Vekić
  Natalia Vikhlyantseva

The following players received entry as lucky losers:
  Zarina Diyas
  Aleksandra Krunić
  Aryna Sabalenka

Withdrawals
Before the tournament
  Alizé Cornet → replaced by  Elena Vesnina
  Julia Görges → replaced by  Tímea Babos
  Petra Kvitová → replaced by  Aleksandra Krunić
  Ekaterina Makarova → replaced by  Aryna Sabalenka
  Elise Mertens → replaced by  Maria Sakkari
  Serena Williams → replaced by  Zarina Diyas

During the tournament
  Madison Keys

WTA doubles main-draw entrants

Seeds

Rankings are as of May 7, 2018.

Other entrants
The following pairs received wildcards into the doubles main draw:
  Deborah Chiesa /  Alice Matteucci
  Sara Errani /  Martina Trevisan 
  Olga Savchuk /  Elina Svitolina

The following pair received entry as alternates:
  Johanna Konta /  Zhang Shuai

Withdrawals
Before the tournament
  Ekaterina Makarova

During the tournament
  Madison Keys

Champions

Men's singles
 
  Rafael Nadal def.  Alexander Zverev, 6–1, 1–6, 6–3

Women's singles
 
  Elina Svitolina def.  Simona Halep, 6–0, 6–4

Men's doubles
 
  Juan Sebastián Cabal /  Robert Farah  def.  Pablo Carreño Busta /  João Sousa, 3–6, 6–4, [10–4]

Women's doubles
 
  Ashleigh Barty /  Demi Schuurs def.  Andrea Sestini Hlaváčková /  Barbora Strýcová, 6–3, 6–4

References

External links
 Official website
 Official Twitter